Inequality may refer to:

Economics
 Attention inequality, unequal distribution of attention across users, groups of people, issues in etc. in attention economy
 Economic inequality, difference in economic well-being between population groups
 Spatial inequality, the unequal distribution of income and resources across geographical regions
 Income inequality metrics, used to measure income and economic inequality among participants in a particular economy
 International inequality, economic differences between countries

Healthcare
 Health equity, the study of differences in the quality of health and healthcare across different populations

Mathematics
 Inequality (mathematics), a relation between two values when they are different

Social sciences
 Educational inequality, the unequal distribution of academic resources to socially excluded communities
 Gender inequality, unequal treatment or perceptions of individuals due to their gender
 Participation inequality, the phenomenon in which a small percentage of people contributes the majority of information to the total outcome
 Racial inequality, hierarchical social distinctions between racial and ethnic categories within a society
 Social inequality, unequal opportunities and rewards for different social positions or statuses within a group

See also
 Equality (disambiguation)
 Equal (disambiguation)
 Inequation (≠)
 List of countries by wealth inequality
 List of countries by income inequality
 List of inequalities

Social science disambiguation pages
Mathematics disambiguation pages
Social inequality